Kopiah was a town in Lewis County, Washington located 8 miles southeast of Centralia. The 1910 census showed 298 individuals, but the 1930 census showed only 115.

A post office operated from 1906 to 1928.

Ghost towns in Lewis County, Washington
Ghost towns in Washington (state)